Soto la Marina is a town in Soto la Marina Municipality located in the Mexican state of Tamaulipas. It was directly hit by Hurricane Alex in 2010.  It is located on the banks of the Soto la Marina river, just up river from the small ocean port of La Pesca, and downriver from Ciudad Victoria, the capital of the State of Tamaulipas. 180 miles South of Brownsville, Texas, it is accessible from there via a highway in approximately 3 hours driving time.

The municipality includes some of the mountain range called the Sierra de Tamaulipas.

Climate
Soto La Marina has a semi-arid climate (Köppen climate classification BSh) that closely borders on a humid subtropical and a tropical savanna climate. Winters are mild and short with the average maximum temperature being  and the minimum temperature being  in the coldest month, January. Precipitation during this time of the year is low; nonetheless, winters tend to be foggy and cloudy. Frosts are extremely rare. Summers are long, hot, and humid with June being the warmest month, with an average temperature of .It tends to be sunnier during the summer season, averaging 13-14 clear days and 14-15 partly cloudy days compared with only 8-10 clear days from December to February. Precipitation is low, averaging  with the months June to October seeing an increase in precipitation.

References

Notes

External links
Gobierno Municipal de Soto la Marina Official website

Populated places in Tamaulipas